The 1956 Vanwall Trophy was a non-championship Formula One race held on 22 July 1956 at Snetterton Circuit, Norfolk. The race was won by Roy Salvadori, in a privately entered Maserati 250F.

Results

References

Snetterton
1956 in British motorsport